Anton Rudoy (born 21 February 1983 in Almaty) is a Kazakhstani and Russian rugby union player. He plays as a flanker.

Rudoy has played in Russia for Enisey-STM, in 2003, RC Novokuznetsk, from 2004 to 2007, and once again for Enisey-STM, since 2008.

He has been a key player for Kazakhstan, since his first game, in 2006. He played in their 2011 Rugby World Cup campaign, that led them to be the second-best team from Asia, reaching a repechage game with Uruguay, lost by 44–7. He also played in their disappointing 2015 Rugby World Cup qualifying, where Kazakhstan was eliminated in the first round, not reaching the final stage of the Asia Cup.

Since 2015 plays for the Russian national rugby union team.

References

External links
Key matches in race to qualify for RWC 2011, IRB Official website, 7 May 2010
It'sRugby player profile.

1983 births
Living people
Kazakhstani rugby union players
Russian rugby union players
Yenisey-STM Krasnoyarsk players
Rugby union flankers
Russia international rugby union players